Timothy Bond (born 1942) is a Canadian director and screenwriter. He normally does television, but has done films as well. He has done episodes of Due South, The New Alfred Hitchcock Presents, Star Trek: The Next Generation, Sliders, and others.

Partial filmography 
1992 
The Lost World
Return to the Lost World
1994
Christy (TV Series)

1995 
The Outer Limits (1995 TV series)
Goosebumps (TV series)

1996 
Night of the Twisters (TV movie)
Goosebumps (TV series)

1997 
The New Ghostwriter Mysteries
The Shadow Men
Goosebumps (TV series)

2001 
High Explosive
She

 2011: 
The Case for Christmas (TV movie)

References

External links 

1942 births
Living people
Canadian television directors
Canadian television writers
Film directors from Ottawa
Writers from Ottawa